A Closer Look is a remix album, and the third album overall, by American R&B musician Babyface. The album was released on November 19, 1991. It has the distinction of being the last album released by Dick Griffey's SOLAR (Sound of Los Angeles Records), as a joint venture with Epic Records.

Track listing

References

Babyface (musician) albums
1991 albums
SOLAR Records albums
Epic Records albums
Albums produced by L.A. Reid
Albums produced by Babyface (musician)
Albums produced by Troy Taylor